Anterior spinal artery syndrome (also known as "anterior spinal cord syndrome") is syndrome caused by ischemia of the anterior spinal artery, resulting in loss of function of the anterior two-thirds of the spinal cord. The region affected includes the descending  corticospinal tract, ascending spinothalamic tract, and autonomic fibers. It is characterized by a corresponding loss of motor function, loss of pain and temperature sensation, and hypotension.

Anterior spinal artery syndrome is the most common form of spinal cord infarction. The anterior spinal cord is at increased risk for infarction because it is supplied by the single anterior spinal artery and has little collateral circulation, unlike the posterior spinal cord which is supplied by two posterior spinal arteries.

Signs and symptoms
 Complete motor paralysis below the level of the lesion due to interruption of the corticospinal tract
 Loss of pain and temperature sensation at and below the level of the lesion due to interruption of the spinothalamic tract
 Retained proprioception and vibratory sensation due to intact dorsal columns
 Autonomic dysfunction may be present and can manifest as hypotension (either orthostatic or frank hypotension), sexual dysfunction, and/or bowel and bladder dysfunction
 Areflexia, flaccid internal and external anal sphincter, urinary retention and intestinal obstruction may also be present in individuals with anterior cord syndrome.
Symptoms usually occur very quickly and are often experienced within one hour of the initial damage.  MRI can detect the magnitude and location of the damage 10–15 hours after the initiation of symptoms.  Diffusion-weighted imaging may be used as it is able to identify the damage within a few minutes of symptomatic onset.

Clinical features include paraparesis or quadriparesis (depending on the level of the injury) and impaired pain and temperature sensation.  Complete motor paralysis below the level of the lesion due to interruption of the corticospinal tract, and loss of pain and temperature sensation at and below the level of the lesion. Proprioception and vibratory sensation is preserved, as it is in the dorsal side of the spinal cord.

Causes
Due to the branches of the aorta that supply the anterior spinal artery, the most common causes are insufficiencies within the aorta.  These include aortic aneurysms, dissections, direct trauma to the aorta, surgeries, and atherosclerosis. Acute disc herniation, cervical spondylosis, kyphoscoliosis, damage to the spinal column and neoplasia all could result in ischemia from anterior spinal artery occlusion leading to anterior cord syndrome.  Other causes include vasculitis, polycythemia, sickle cell disease, decompression sickness, and collagen and elastin disorders. A thrombus in the  artery of Adamkiewicz can lead to an anterior spinal syndrome. This is the most feared, though rare complication of bronchial artery embolization done in massive hemoptysis.

Anatomy

The anterior portion of the spinal cord is supplied by the anterior spinal artery.  It begins at the foramen magnum where branches of the two vertebral arteries exit, merge, and descend along the anterior spinal cord.  As the anterior spinal artery proceeds inferiorly, it receives branches originating mostly from the aorta. The largest aortic branch is the artery of Adamkiewicz.

Diagnosis
An MRI is used in the process of making a diagnosis for this condition

Treatment
Treatment is determined based on the primary cause of anterior cord syndrome.  When the diagnosis of anterior cord syndrome is determined, the prognosis is unfortunate.  The mortality rate is approximately 20%, with 50% of individuals living with anterior cord syndrome having very little or no changes in symptoms.

Eponym
It is also known as "Beck's syndrome".

See also
 Spinal cord injury

References

External links 

Spinal cord disorders
Syndromes affecting the nervous system